Herman Henry Dignan (November 6, 18901956) was a Michigan politician.

Early life
Dignan was born on November 6, 1890 in Saginaw, Michigan. Dignan attended public schools in Frankenmuth, Michigan.

Career
Dignan worked as a hardware dealer. On November 6, 1934, Dignan was elected as a member of the Michigan House of Representatives from the Shiawassee County district. He served in this position from January 2, 1935 to 1938. On November 8, 1939, he was elected as a member of the Michigan Senate from the 15th district. He served in this position from January 4, 1939 to 1942. Dignan was a delegate to Republican National Convention from Michigan in 1940 and 1944. Dignan served as Michigan Secretary of State from 1943 to 1946.

Personal life
Dignan married Nell T. "Nelly" Haley in 1913 in Flint, Michigan. Dignan was a member of the Freemasons and the Shriners. Dignan was Congregationalist.

Death
Dignan died in 1956 and was interred at Oak Hill Cemetery in Owosso, Michigan.

References

1890 births
1956 deaths
American Freemasons
American Congregationalists
Secretaries of State of Michigan
Republican Party Michigan state senators
Republican Party members of the Michigan House of Representatives
Burials in Michigan
20th-century American politicians